Francisco "Frankie" Miñoza (born 29 December 1959) is a Filipino professional golfer.

Miñoza has played extensively in Asia, winning a number of tournaments on the leading Asian and Japanese tours in addition to many lesser events on the local circuits, especially in the Philippines and Malaysia. In 1990 he won three times on the Asia Golf Circuit and topped the tour's Order of Merit. He spent most of the following years, and had his most notable successes, on the Japan Golf Tour.

In 1998 Minoza featured in the top 50 of the Official World Golf Ranking having recorded several top finishes in Japan, including a victory in the Asia Circuit co-sanctioned Kirin Open. He also won three other tournaments on the Asia Circuit, and captured the Order of Merit for the second time.

In 2005, after losing his Japanese tour card, he joined the Asian Tour for the first time since its formal establishment in 1995. He finished 27th on the Asian money list to retain his card and also regained his Japan Golf Tour card by finishing second at the qualifying school. In 2007 he won his second Philippine Open at the age of 46 to claim his first Asian Tour title.

In November 2010, Miñoza earned his 2011 Champions Tour card by finishing second at qualifying school.

Professional wins (34)

Japan Golf Tour wins (7)

*Note: The 1990 Dunlop Open was shortened to 54 holes due to rain.
1Co-sanctioned by the Asia Golf Circuit

Japan Golf Tour playoff record (3–1)

Asian Tour wins (1)

Asia Golf Circuit wins (10)
1986 Indonesia Open
1988 Maekyung Open
1989 Pakistan Open
1990 Taiwan Open, Indonesia Open, Dunlop Open (also a Japan Golf Tour event)
1998 Philippine Open, Philippine Masters, Rolex Masters, Kirin Open (also a Japan Golf Tour event)

Philippine Golf Tour wins (6)

Other wins (9)
1988 Perak Masters (Malaysia), Genting Classic (Malaysia), PFP Classic (Malaysia),
1989 Royal Johor Golf Classic (Malaysia), Sabah Masters, Perak Masters (Malaysia), Rothmans Malaysian Masters
1990 Rothmans Malaysian Masters
1993 Philippine Masters

Japan PGA Senior Tour wins (3)
2011 Komatsu Open
2012 Japan Senior Open
2013 ISPS Handa Cup - Akibare Senior Masters

Playoff record
European Senior Tour playoff record (0–1)

Results in major championships

Note: Miñoza never played in the U.S. Open.

CUT = missed the half-way cut
WD = withdrew
"T" = tied

Results in World Golf Championships

QF, R16, R32, R64 = Round in which player lost in match play

Team appearances
Amateur
Eisenhower Trophy (representing the Philippines): 1980, 1982

Professional
World Cup (representing the Philippines): 1983, 1989, 1990, 1992, 1995
Dunhill Cup (representing the Philippines): 1987, 1988

References

External links

Filipino male golfers
Asian Tour golfers
Japan Golf Tour golfers
Sportspeople from Manila
1959 births
Living people